Zenodorus orbiculatus, the round ant eater, is a species of ant-hunting jumping spider found in Australia. The species was first formally named by Eugen von Keyserling in 1881 as Hasarius orbiculatus.

Description
Zenodorus orbiculatus are dark brown to black, with pale markings on the carapace behind the eyes, a circular pattern on the abdomen with a dot in the centre, and a pale band on the femur of each leg. Females and males grow to  overall body length. The species is widespread and abundant in Queensland, scattered throughout the remainder of Australia.

The food preference is ants, but they also consume other spiders and insects.

Gallery

References

Spiders of Australia
Spiders described in 1881
Salticidae